The Republic of Panama's status as major flag state for maritime vessels and owner of the Panama Canal has led to the opening missions in cities with significant harbour traffic, such as Antwerp, Rotterdam, Hamburg, Mumbai, Kobe, and Santos.

Of note, Panama was also one of the more significant countries to maintain diplomatic relations with the Republic of China, also known as Taiwan, until 2017, when the government of then-President Juan Carlos Varela recognized the People's Republic of China and began diplomatic relations with it. This led to the closure of its embassy in Taipei, and the opening of missions in Beijing, Guangzhou, Hong Kong, and Shanghai.

This listing excludes honorary consulates, trade missions, and the overseas offices of the Panama Maritime Authority.

Current missions

Africa

Americas

Asia

Europe

Oceania

Multilateral organisations

Gallery

Closed missions

Americas

Asia

See also
 Foreign relations of Panama
 List of diplomatic missions in Panama
 Visa policy of Panama

Notes

References

Ministry of Foreign Relations of Panama
Embassies and Consulates of Panama

List
Panama
Diplomatic missions